Glyphidocera salinae is a moth in the family Autostichidae. It was described by Walsingham in 1911. It is found in Mexico (Oaxaca).

The wingspan is about 20 mm. The forewings are uniform fawn-brownish, without spots, but with a very slight shade at the end of the cell. The hindwings are pale fawn-brownish.

References

Moths described in 1911
Glyphidocerinae